Daan Mogot City, also known as Damoci, is a mixed development project at Daan Mogot, Jakarta. The development area has a land area of 16 hectares. The total will be developed in 4 phases.  There are 7 residential towers built on an area of 7 hectares with a shopping mall built on an area of 4 hectares.

See also

External link
Daan Mogot City

References

Buildings and structures in Jakarta
Residential skyscrapers in Indonesia